The Andrej Čuš and Greens of Slovenia (AČZS) is a political party in Slovenia.

History
The Greens of Slovenia was formed on 11 June 1989 in the course of the Revolutions of 1989, when Slovenia was still part of Yugoslavia. At the first direct election in Slovenia, the Greens gained 8.8% of the votes cast and won 8 seats in the National Assembly legislature. At the 1992 parliamentary election the party gained 3.7% of the votes cast, losing 3 mandates in the assembly. Since in 1996 it fell at the 4-percent-hurdle, it is no longer represented in parliament.

At the parliamentary election in September 2008, the party won no seats. At the early 2011 Slovenian parliamentary election on 4 December 2011, the party won 0.36% of the vote, thus not gaining any seat in the National Assembly. The party received 0.50% of the vote in the Slovenian parliamentary election on 13 July 2014, and again did not win any seats in parliament.

In March 2018 Andrej Čuš took over the leadership and renamed the party Andrej Čuš and Greens of Slovenia.

Europe Elects stated in April 2021 that the party displays the logo of the European Green Party (EGP) on their website, however, the EGP contacted Europe Elects and denied any affiliation.

Election results

National Assembly

European Parliament

See also
Youth Party – European Greens

References

External links
Official website

1989 establishments in Slovenia
Centrist parties in Slovenia
Green conservative parties
Green parties in Europe
Organizations based in Ljubljana
Political parties established in 1989
Political parties in Yugoslavia
Green political parties in Slovenia